The Ball Hogs are an American men's 3-on-3 basketball team that plays in the BIG3.

2017

Draft

2018

Draft

Current roster

References

Big3 teams
Basketball teams established in 2017
2017 establishments in the United States